Maruja is a Spanish given name, a diminutive form of the baptismal name María.

People with the name
 Maruja Bustamante (born 1978), Argentine actress and playwright
 Maruja Callaved (1928–2018), Spanish television director
 Maruja Carrasco (1944–2018), Spanish botanist and academic
 Maruja Fuentes (1978–2010), Puerto Rican architect and designer
 Maruja Grifell (1907–1968), Mexican actress
 Maruja Mallo (1902–1995), Spanish painter
 Maruja Montes (1930–1993), Brazilian-Argentine actress and vedette
 Maruja Pachón Castro (born 1948), Colombian kidnapping victim and Minister for Education
 Maruja Pibernat (fl. 1934–2004), Spanish-Argentine film and radio actress
 Maruja Torres (born 1943), Spanish writer and journalist
 Maruja Troncoso Ortega (born 1937), Spanish singer and professor

Fictional characters
 Maruja, a Filipino comic book character created by Mars Ravelo
 Tola y Maruja, a Colombian cross-dressing comedy duo

References

Spanish feminine given names